Chelsea Elizabeth Davis (born November 2, 1992) is an American artistic gymnast.

Personal life 
Davis is the daughter of Peggy and John Davis. Davis's older brother John coaches gymnastics in Arkansas. Her mother is retired. In addition to a sibling, she has a Chihuahua named Princess Molly. When she is not doing gymnastics, her hobbies include video games, board games and NASCAR. In the gym, Davis trains 36 hours a week. Chelsea started gymnastics when she was 3 years old in her hometown. She now competes for the Georgia Gym Dogs.

Routines 

Davis performs the following skills on bars, beam, floor, and vault.

Floor Music 
 Current: Thunder by nuttin but stringz

Competitive History

Competition placing results

References

External links 
 Official Website
 USA-Gymnastics.org Athlete Bio
 Gyndivas.us Profile
 Texas Dreams gymnastics Official website

1992 births
Sportspeople from Austin, Texas
American female artistic gymnasts
Living people
People from Coppell, Texas
People from Lakeway, Texas
U.S. women's national team gymnasts
21st-century American women